Shafia Khatun is a Bangladesh Awami League politician and the former Member of Parliament from a reserved seat.

Career
Khatun was elected to parliament from reserved seat as a Bangladesh Awami League candidate in 2009. She served as the President of Bangladesh Mohila Awami League from 2017 to 2022.

References

Awami League politicians
Living people
Women members of the Jatiya Sangsad
9th Jatiya Sangsad members
21st-century Bangladeshi women politicians
21st-century Bangladeshi politicians
Year of birth missing (living people)